Pearson Branch is a stream in Camden County in the U.S. state of Missouri. It is a tributary to the Osage River within the Lake of the Ozarks. The north flowing stream enters the Lake near the lakeshore community of Dodds.

Pearson Branch has the name of a pioneer citizen.

See also
List of rivers of Missouri

References

Rivers of Camden County, Missouri
Rivers of Missouri